Gran Via is the second major business district of Barcelona, after Diagonal Mar. It forms part of the Fira de Barcelona, the second largest trade fair and exhibition centre in Europe. It straddles the borders between Barcelona, L'Hospitalet de Llobregat and El Prat de Llobregat. The Gran Via business centre consists of the following subdivisions: Gran Via, which has 240,000 m² of exhibition floor space divided into 8 pavilions; the Gran Via Convention Centre, with capacity for 5,600 delegates and a surface area of 14,000 m²; the more than ten skyscrapers alongside Plaza de Europa; also Gran Vía 2 near Barcelona International Airport, which has a shopping centre with 200 shops, 20 restaurants, 15 cinemas and a hypermarket. Gran Via is also adjacent to Ciutat de la Justícia de Barcelona i l'Hospitalet de Llobregat which hosts most of the legal departments of the Barcelona metropolitan area.

Public transport 
The "Gran Via" center is served by line 8 of the Barcelona Metro and FGC commuter train network, at the Europa-Fira station, and also by the bus line 79.

Skyscrapers

See also 
 Diagonal Mar, major business district of Barcelona
 Gran Via de les Corts Catalanes, more simply known as Gran Via, street in Barcelona
 22@
 Blau@Ictínea (ca)

References

External links 
 Aerial photographs of Gran Via on Fira de Barcelona page

Neighbourhoods of Barcelona
Economy of Barcelona
Central business districts
Financial districts in Spain
⊗